Rasmus Cronvall (born 20 March 2002) is a Swedish football forward who plays for Tvååker in a cooperation deal with Varbergs BoIS.

References

2002 births
Living people
Swedish footballers
Association football forwards
Varbergs BoIS players
Tvååkers IF players
Allsvenskan players
Ettan Fotboll players